Bakhtiar Rahmani (born 23 September 1991) is an Iranian footballer who plays for Dalkurd in Swedish Superettan league.

Early life
Rahmani was born in Sarpol-e Zahab.

Club career

Foolad
Rahmani has played his entire career for Foolad. After the release of Jalal Kameli-Mofrad in the summer of 2012, he was chosen as the club captain by head coach Hossein Faraki, when he was just twenty years old and led the club to the fourth place. He renewed his contract with Foolad for another three years on 30 April 2013, keeping him at the club until 2016. Rahmani helped the club to win its second championship in the 2013–14 season, in which he scored five goals and assisted seven times in 28 matches.

Tractor
In the summer of 2015 Rahmani signed a two–year contract with Tractor to spend his conscription period at the club.

Esteghlal
On 3 June 2016, he joined Esteghlal on a two-year contract.

Zob Ahan
On 12 December 2017, he joined Zob Ahan.

International career
Rahmani was first called up for the Iran national under-15 football team in 2004. He has played for the Iran national football team in all ranks. He was called up and played for the Iran national under-23 football team by Alireza Mansourian in 2011. He was also captain of the under-23 team. On 14 May 2013, Rahmani was called up for the Iran national football team by coach Carlos Queiroz. He made his debut against Oman in a friendly match on 22 May 2013. On 1 June 2014, he was named in Iran's 2014 FIFA World Cup squad by Carlos Queiroz. However, he did not play for Team Melli in the tournament, as he was an unused substitute in three matches.

Statistics

Club career statistics
Last updated: 9 September 2019

 Assist goals

International goals

Under-20

Under-23

Honours
Foolad
Iran Pro League (1): 2013–14

References

External links

1991 births
Living people
People from Kermanshah Province
Iranian footballers
Iranian expatriate footballers
Iran under-20 international footballers
Iran international footballers
2014 FIFA World Cup players
Azadegan League players
Persian Gulf Pro League players
Foolad FC players
Tractor S.C. players
Esteghlal F.C. players
Paykan F.C. players
Zob Ahan Esfahan F.C. players
Sepahan S.C. footballers
Al-Shamal SC players
Sanat Naft Abadan F.C. players
Dalkurd FF players
Kurdish sportspeople
Association football midfielders
Expatriate footballers in Qatar
Iranian expatriate sportspeople in Qatar
Expatriate footballers in Sweden
Iranian expatriate sportspeople in Sweden